Syed A. Hoda is a professor of pathology at the Weill Medical College of Cornell University, and an Attending Pathologist at the New York Presbyterian Hospital. Hoda is a surgical pathologist with a particular interest in diagnostic breast pathology.
 
He is currently listed in the "Best Doctors in the USA" published by U.S. News & World Report.  Hoda is included in Castle-Connolly's listing of Best Doctors in New York and in United States of America for several years.

References

External links
Professional biography

Year of birth missing (living people)
Living people
American academics of Pakistani descent
American physicians of Pakistani descent
American pathologists
American science journalists
Cornell University faculty
Dow Medical College alumni
Pakistani emigrants to the United States
Pakistani pathologists
Pakistani science journalists
People from Karachi